Gabba may refer to:

Music 
 Gabber, a subgenre of hardcore techno also known as "gabba"
 Gabba (band), a tribute band covering the pop songs of ABBA in the punk style of The Ramones

People with the surname 
 Bassano Gabba (1844–1928), Italian lawyer and politician
 Carlo Francesco Gabba (1865–1920), Italian lawyer
 Giulia Gabba (born 1987), Italian tennis player

Places 
 The Gabba, a cricket ground in Brisbane, Australia
 Woolloongabba, a suburb of Brisbane in which said cricket ground is located
 The Gabba Ward, a city council ward in Brisbane
 Gabba Island, an uninhabited Australian island south of Papua New Guinea
 Gabula (Syria), an ancient city near Aleppo historically known as Gabba

Other uses 
 Gabbeh or gabba, a type of Iranian pile rug of coarse quality

See also 
 Gabba Gabba Hey, a catchphrase associated with the band The Ramones
 Yo Gabba Gabba!, a children's television series on Nick Jr.
 Gaba (disambiguation)